Alan Estrada Gutiérrez (born December 23, 1980 in Tepatitlán de Morelos, Jalisco, Mexico) is a Mexican actor, dancer and singer. His best known role was "Mario" in the Spanish musical Hoy No Me Puedo Levantar. He is also known for his YouTube channel Alan X El Mundo, documenting his world travels.

Career 
At the age of 18 years he went to Mexico City to begin his artistic training. His professional debut was in 2000 in the play Oedipus at Colonus starring Ignacio Lopez Tarso. After that he participated in several revivals as Chicago the musical, Saturday Night Fever and Joseph and the Amazing Technicolor Dreamcoat (all Mexican productions). His first television appearance was a minor role as "Claudio" in the soap opera Clap in 2003. He also acted in the low-budget film Hotel Garage, the tape has never been released.

In 2006 he was cast by Nacho Cano as "Mario" starring the Mexican production of the musical Hoy No Me Puedo Levantar, based on the Spanish music group Mecano. He played more than 400 performances at the Teatro 1 del Centro Cultural Telmex and later in Hoy No Me Puedo Levantar. El Concierto a version of the musical adapted for a tour that opened at the Auditorio Nacional in Mexico City. By the same time he made a special appearance in the Univision’s soap opera Lola...Érase una vez as "Nicolas". He also starred two short films Dejalo Así and Tabacotla. The Mexican magazine Quien listed him as one of the sexiest men in 2007.

In 2008, followed by the success in Mexico, the Spanish production of Hoy No Me Puedo Levantar invited him to close the season of the musical in Madrid, Spain and started the tour of the Iberian country. The same year he has three Mexican movies in theaters: a brief appearance in Casi Divas (Road to Fame), followed by the romantic comedy Amor Letra Por Letra starring with Silvia Navarro, and the parody Divina Confusion of Salvador Garcini, also starred by Jesus Ochoa, Diana Bracho, Pedro Armendáriz, Luis Roberto Guzman, Lisa Owen, Adal Ramones, Kalimba and Ana Brenda Contreras. While he was in México promoting his films received the proposal to work for television in Bailando por un Sueño so decided to leave the musical in Spain.

Alan began his participation in the second season of Televisa’s reality: El Show De Los Sueños, Amigos Del Alma. His team “Los Mosqueteros” reached the final: Los Reyes Del Show, they did not win the contest but it gave him the opportunity to get to an international audience showing his talent in singing and dancing. He had a role in the second season of the Mexican soap opera Verano de amor as "Fabian Escudero" and appeared in the Mexican musical Que planton! as "El Pino".

He currently co-stars in the Mexican soap opera Amor Bravío and is a co-host of the morning talk show "Hoy" which airs in the United States on Univision. He also hosts an online travelling show called "Alan x el Mundo".

In 2020, he participated in the second season of ¿Quién es la máscara? as the Jalapeño.

Theatre

Film

Alan x El Mundo 
The idea emerged when he visited Asia, India, Thailand and Cambodia. While he was doing his artistic career,  he visited China and soon Japan, which was how Alan x El Mundo emerged. After the death of his mom, he traveled to Morocco, England and Iceland. After traveling to the Czech Republic, he gained fame on YouTube. As of November 2020, the channel had 2.66 million subscribers.

Places
He visited places around the world, including Disney Parks, the Set of Game of Thrones and the Memorial of the Mauthausen concentration camp in Austria. He also went to the opening of Pandora – The World of Avatar at Disney's Animal Kingdom

Personal life
Estrada is gay.

References

External links 
 
 Alan Estrada at the Internet Movie Database

1980 births
Mexican male film actors
Mexican male stage actors
Male actors from Jalisco
Mexican YouTubers
People from Tepatitlán
Living people
21st-century Mexican male singers
Mexican gay actors
Mexican gay musicians
Gay singers
Mexican LGBT singers
LGBT YouTubers